Ross Murray (born 8 October 1990) is an English middle distance runner. He competed in the 1500 metres at the 2012 Summer Olympics. In July 2012, Murray ran the mile at the London Grand Prix, placing second with a time of 3:52.77.  In the preliminaries of the 1500m at the Olympics, Murray ran a 3:36.74 to finish fourth in his heat and qualify for the semi-finals. Ross did not qualify for the event finals as he finished tenth in his semi-final with a time of 3:44.92. Murray has a personal best time of 3:34.76 for 1500 metres (2012), which is almost 10 seconds faster than his season's best of 3:43.93 from 2011.

Murray is coached by Steve Cram.

References

1990 births
Living people
Athletes (track and field) at the 2012 Summer Olympics
Olympic athletes of Great Britain
British male middle-distance runners